Rhetorica: A Journal of the History of Rhetoric is the official publication of the International Society for the History of Rhetoric. It is a peer-reviewed quarterly academic journal published University of California Press, in Berkeley, California. The journal includes articles, book reviews and bibliographies that examine the theory and practice of rhetoric in all periods and languages and their relationship with poetics, philosophy, religion and law. The official languages of the Society and of the journal are English, French, German, Italian, Latin, and Spanish, with articles and features corresponding.

External links

International Society for the History of Rhetoric Official website

Multilingual journals
English-language journals
French-language journals
German-language journals
Italian-language journals
Latin-language journals
Spanish-language journals
University of California Press academic journals
Publications with year of establishment missing
Rhetoric journals
Writing
Publications established in 1983